Vincent Luis (born 27 June 1989 in Vesoul, France) is a French professional triathlete. Besides his many WTS wins and participations to the 2012 Summer Olympics and 2016 Summer Olympics, he won the ITU World Championship in 2019 and 2020, and the Mixed Relay Team World Championship with the French national team in 2015, 2018 and 2019. He won the Junior World Championship and Junior European Championship in 2008, as well as multiple French national titles over the years. 

Luis also competes in Super League Triathlon. He was dominant in the early years of the league, winning both the 2018 and 2019 Super League Triathlon Championship. He finished 5th in the 2021 Championship Series. His dominance, and 2020 Tokyo Olympic bid, were the subject of the 2021 docuseries Invincible

Early career 

In the six years from 2006 to 2010, Luis took part in 23 ITU competitions and achieved 13 top ten positions.

The following list is based upon the official ITU Profile Page. Unless indicated otherwise, the following competitions are Olympic Distance Triathlons in the Elite category.

BG = the sponsor British Gas · DNF = did not finish · DNS = did not start

External links 
 Vincent Luis' triathlon club in French

Notes 

Sportspeople from Vesoul
French male triathletes
1989 births
Living people
Triathletes at the 2012 Summer Olympics
Triathletes at the 2016 Summer Olympics
Olympic triathletes of France
Triathletes at the 2020 Summer Olympics
Medalists at the 2020 Summer Olympics
Olympic bronze medalists for France
Olympic medalists in triathlon